Politia may refer to:

 Politia, a neighbourhood in the suburb of Kifissia, Athens, Greece
 Poliţia Română, the Romanian Police

See also
 Politeia (disambiguation)
 Policy (disambiguation)
 Police (disambiguation)